Peter de Smet (4 July 1944, Amsterdam – 6 January 2003, Amsterdam) was a Dutch comic-strip artist. He was the author of De Generaal ("The General").

From the 1960s onwards de Smet worked as an artist in advertising and started drawing comics in the same time. An early version of De Generaal was sold to Tintin but was never published. In 1968 de Smet started his series Fulco set in medieval times for the magazine 't Kapoentje but had to give up due to illness. In the following period, de Smet returned to advertising with strips like Pieter Pienter for a Bank, which was published in magazines like Tina and Donald Duck.

In 1971 Pep magazine picked up De Generaal, and published it through several incarnations of the magazine, notably Eppo.

References 

Peter de Smet at the RKD

1944 births
2003 deaths
Dutch comics artists
Dutch humorists
Artists from Amsterdam